is a Japanese musician and singer-songwriter. He has been the vocalist of the rock band Buck-Tick since 1985, previously being their drummer from 1983. He released the solo album Ai no Wakusei in 2004 and was also a member of Schwein alongside Hisashi Imai (Buck-Tick), Sascha Konietzko (KMFDM) and Raymond Watts. In 2015, he formed a solo project called The Mortal.

History

Buck-Tick
Originally Atsushi was the drummer for Buck-Tick. When the members graduated high school and moved to Tokyo, Atsushi was the only one left in Gunma. He then asked Toll Yagami if he could be the singer for his band SP, but was declined. Ironically, he ended up switching to vocalist of Buck-Tick, after the band fired Araki, and Toll became their drummer.

His last name was originally written with the first kanji as "" ("sakura"), but when his mother died in 1990 he changed it to "", the older version. He also wrote "Long Distance Call" about his mother's death. He married Buck-Tick's stylist in 1991, but divorced a year later. They have one son, Akutagawa Prize-winning author . He married again in June 2004.

Throughout Buck-Tick's long career, he has written the most lyrics to their songs. He also performs on Der Zibet's Shishunki II and Kaikoteki Mirai - Nostalgic Future, Issay's Flowers, PIG's Wrecked, Masami Tsuchiya's Mori no Hito ~Forest People~ and Chiaki Kuriyama's Circus.

On December 9, 2018, Sakurai was visibly unwell during Buck Tick's concert at Zepp Divercity, but he insisted on finishing the performance. After the concert, he was diagnosed with gastrointestinal bleeding and subsequent shows had to be postponed for his treatment.

Solo
In 2004, Atsushi released his first solo album , which featured tracks composed by musicians such as Wayne Hussey (The Sisters of Mercy), J. G. Thirlwell (Foetus), Cube Juice, My Way My Love, Raymond Watts, Cloudchair (Jake of Guniw Tools), Masami Tsuchiya, and the remake of a 1992 song where he collaborated with Clan of Xymox.

2004 also saw his acting debut, with the starring role in Ryuhei Kitamura's short film Longinus. He released a book of his poetry and lyrics called  in 2004.
In 2015, he announced the formation of his second solo project, a band called The Mortal. The group consists of guitarist Jake Cloudchair, guitarist Yukio Murata (My Way My Love), bassist Ken Miyo (M-Age) and drummer Takahito Akiyama (Downy). The mini album Spirit was released on October 14 and they played a three date tour in November. The full-length album I am Mortal was released on November 11, 2015.

Discography
Singles
 "Sacrifice" (May 26, 2004), Oricon Singles Chart Peak Position: #25
  #22
  #62

Albums
 , Oricon Albums Chart Peak Position: #15

DVDs
 Longinus (August 25, 2004, short film), Oricon DVDs Chart Peak Position: #16
  #47

With The Mortal
 Spirit (October 14, 2015) #11
 I am Mortal (November 11, 2015) #12

With Buck-Tick

Books
 
 Sacrifice (July 20, 2004)

References

External links
Atsushi Sakurai at Victor Entertainment
The Mortal Official website

Buck-Tick members
Visual kei musicians
Japanese male singer-songwriters
Japanese male rock singers
Japanese rock drummers
Japanese male actors
Musicians from Gunma Prefecture
1966 births
Living people
Schwein members